Shurishing Yungdrung Dungdrakling Monastery is a Buddhist monastery in Sikkim, northeastern India.

See also
Bon

References

Buddhist monasteries in Sikkim
Tibetan Buddhist monasteries and temples in India